The 1973 Kent State Golden Flashes football team was an American football team that represented Kent State University in the Mid-American Conference (MAC) during the 1973 NCAA Division I football season. In their third season under head coach Don James, the Golden Flashes compiled a 9–2 record (4–1 against MAC opponents), finished in second place in the MAC, and outscored all opponents by a combined total of 300 to 131. Nick Saban was a graduate assistant on James' staff during the 1973 season.

The team included brothers Larry Poole, a tailback, and Tommie Poole, a defensive tackle.

Don James was credited with turning a "mediocre" Kent State program into a MAC power in his four years as head coach. The team's 9–2 record in 1973 was the best in program history.

Schedule

Team players drafted into the NFL

References

Kent State
Kent State Golden Flashes football seasons
Kent State Golden Flashes football